is Japanese idol group AKB48's fourth single,  and the second major single released through DefSTAR Records, on January 31, 2007. The title track was sung with 14 members, 6 members fewer than their last single "Aitakatta".

Music video
"Seifuku ga Jama o Suru" drew public attention with its controversial music video, which is a literal visualization of the lyrics, somewhat hinting at the subject of enjo kosai. As its lyrics indicates, the video clip was filmed in Shibuya.

Each  CD also includes 2 DVDs, one is video clip and the other is "Making of "Seifuku ga Jama o Suru", as well as following premiums.
 Original Trading Cards (one of 3 different designs)
 A flyer for premium application
 CD sleeve in different design

There was a surprise live performance at two locations in Shibuya on the release date January 31, 2007.

Reception
Since many "Aitakatta" limited editions remained unsold, the Seifuku ga Jama wo Suru limited sets were produced in a smaller quantity, making it one of the rarer to find releases.
The single charted 5 weeks in the top 200 with the highest rank at #7, the highest ever record for AKB48. But "Seifuku ga Jama o Suru" wasn’t quite as well received as it only sold 21,989 copies.

Track listing

Charts

Personnel
The performers of the title track are as follows:

Center: Minami Takahashi, Atsuko Maeda
Team A - Tomomi Itano, Haruna Kojima, Atsuko Maeda, Minami Minegishi, Rina Nakanishi, Mai Oshima, Mariko Shinoda, Minami Takahashi,
Team K - Sayaka Akimoto, Tomomi Kasai, Yuka Masuda, Sae Miyazawa, Erena Ono, Yuko Oshima
SDN48: Noro Kayo, Ohori Megumi, Serina, Nachu

References 

AKB48 songs
2007 singles
Songs with lyrics by Yasushi Akimoto
Defstar Records singles